James Stephens Brown, Jr. (c. 1859January 6, 1946) was an American Democratic politician. He served as the Mayor of Nashville, Tennessee, from 1906 to 1910

Early life
Brown was born circa 1859. He graduated from the United States Naval Academy.

Career
Brown served a naval officer in the Spanish–American War of 1898. He became a lawyer, and he joined the firm of Champion, Head, and Brown. He served as Mayor of Nashville from 1906 to 1910. He subsequently moved to Memphis.

Personal life and death
Brown was married to Madeline Pattie McComb on November 6, 1895. They had three children: James S. Brown, III, Worthington Brown, and Berta Brown Radford. He was Presbyterian.

Brown died on January 6, 1946, at his home in Memphis. He was buried in Mount Olivet Cemetery in Nashville.

References

1850s births
1946 deaths
United States Naval Academy alumni
American military personnel of the Spanish–American War
Tennessee Democrats
Mayors of Nashville, Tennessee
People from Memphis, Tennessee
Burials at Mount Olivet Cemetery (Nashville)